Wes Johnson (born 1972) is an American professional baseball coach. He is the pitching coach for the LSU Tigers of NCAA (NCAA).

Career
Johnson is from Sherwood, Arkansas. He graduated from the University of Arkansas at Monticello in 1994. He began his coaching career at Abundant Life School in Sherwood. He has served as a pitching coach for the Central Arkansas Bears and Dallas Baptist Patriots, before joining the Mississippi State Bulldogs in 2016. He spent one season with Mississippi State before he was hired to coach the Arkansas Razorbacks. After the 2018 season, the Minnesota Twins of Major League Baseball hired him as their pitching coach.

On June 26, 2022, Johnson was announced as the new pitching coach of the LSU Tigers. Leaving his pitching coach role with the first-place Twins for the same position at the NCAA level was reported as a rare move by many in the media, including Jeff Passan.

References

External links
Minnesota Twins coach bio

Living people
People from Sherwood, Arkansas
Baseball coaches from Arkansas
University of Arkansas at Monticello alumni
Central Arkansas Bears baseball coaches
Dallas Baptist Patriots baseball coaches
Major League Baseball pitching coaches
Minnesota Twins coaches
Mississippi State Bulldogs baseball coaches
Arkansas Razorbacks baseball coaches
High school baseball coaches in the United States
Year of birth missing (living people)
1972 births